The volcano mouse or Javan shrew-like mouse (Mus vulcani) is a species of rodent in the family Muridae endemic to Indonesia.

References

Mus (rodent)
Mammals described in 1919
Taxonomy articles created by Polbot